The Aviation Hall Of Fame & Museum of New Jersey was founded in 1972 and preserves New Jersey's aviation and space heritage. The museum displays historic aircraft, space equipment, artifacts, photographs, art and an aircraft model collection. The library has more than 4,000 volumes and a collection of aviation video. It is located at Teterboro Airport, the oldest operating airport in the Tri-State Region, at 400 Fred Wehran Drive, Teterboro, New Jersey.

History
The museum was founded in 1972 by Pat Reilly and Donald G. Borg. Initially located in a radio tower at Teterboro Airport, it moved to a nearby building in 1985, and again in 1997 to a much larger facility.

Aircraft on display
 Bell 47
 Bell AH-1 Cobra
 Grumman OV-1 Mohawk
 Lockheed L-402 Bushmaster
 Martin 2-0-2
 Sikorsky HH-52 Seaguard
 The flight deck and first few rows of seats from a Convair 880

Honorees

Aviation timeline for New Jersey 
1793 French balloonist Jean-Pierre Blanchard ascended from Philadelphia, flew across the Delaware River and landed in Deptford Township, New Jersey. The Western Hemisphere's first flight took 45 minutes and covered 15 miles on January 9.
1830 Charles Durant of Jersey City, New Jersey became the first American balloonist to fly.
1863 Solomon Andrews (balloonist) of Perth Amboy, New Jersey constructed and flew the first American dirigible.
1909 The Boland brothers of Rahway, New Jersey built and flew New Jersey's first fixed-wing aircraft. They were also the first to fly in South America.
1912 Oliver G. Simmons in a Wright Flyer carried the first official sack of mail across the Raritan Bay from South Amboy to Perth Amboy.
1918 Five New Jersey combat pilots became World War I flying aces.
1921 The world's largest hangar and America's first dirigible, the USS Shenandoah (ZR-1), were built in Lakehurst, New Jersey.
1922 The world's largest airplane, the Barling Bomber, was constructed at Teterboro Airport by the Wittemann brothers.
1923 Wright aeronautical air-cooled Whirlwind engines, built in Princeton, New Jersey.
1925 Hadley Field in South Plainfield, New Jersey was established as an airmail hub.
1926 Teterboro-built Fokker trimotor powered by a Whirlwind engines was the first to fly over the North Pole with Richard Byrd and Floyd Bennett at the controls.
1927 Charles Lindbergh flew solo across the Atlantic in the Spirit of St. Louis powered by a Whirlwind engine. Two weeks later, Clarence Chamberlin in a Wright-Bellanca built in Princeton, New Jersey flew to Germany with a Whirlwind engine. A month later, Richard Byrd used a Whirlwind engine to fly to France.
1928 Newark Airport opened.
1929 William Conrad (New Jersey) at Newark Airport was America's first air traffic controller.
1930 Fokker build's the world's largest passenger plane, a Fokker F.32 at Teterboro Airport.
1930 Eddie August Schneider of Jersey City, New Jersey established the transcontinental airspeed record for people under 18 years of age.
1932 Amelia Earhart prepares for her solo transatlantic flight at Teterboro Airport
1933 Teaneck, New Jersey established the first high school aviation course in the nation.
1933 The Navy dirigible USS Akron (ZRS-4) crashes in the Atlantic Ocean off Barnegat, New Jersey.
1936 Chester Decker of Glen Rock, New Jersey becomes the National Soaring Champion. He won the title again in 1939.
1937 Hindenburg ignites at Lakehurst Naval Air Station.
1941 Civil Air Patrol is founded in New Jersey by Gill Robb Wilson.
1942-1945 General Motors’ Eastern Aircraft Division built 13,500 Grumman fighter planes at Linden and Trenton plants. The Curtiss-Wright Corporation built 281,164 engines and 146,468 electric propellers in plants in six north Jersey locations.
1945 Major Thomas McGuire of Ridgewood, New Jersey became America's second leading flying ace with 38 enemy kills.
1945 General Frederick Castle of Mountain Lakes, New Jersey 1st Lt. Kenneth Walsh of Jersey City and McGuire were recipients of the Medal of Honor.
1947 Reaction Motors of Denville, New Jersey developed the rocket engine for the Bell X-1
1949 Bill Odom flew a single-engine Beach Bonanza non-stop from Hawaii to Teterboro.
1953 Charles J. Fletcher of Sussex, New Jersey invents and flies the world's first hovercraft.
1968 Walter M. Schirra of Oradell, New Jersey becomes the only astronaut to fly in all three spacecraft. The Mercury, Gemini and Apollo.
1969 Edwin Aldrin of Montclair, New Jersey was the first astronaut to land a vehicle on the moon, and the second person to walk on the moon.
1973 Malcolm Forbes of Far Hills, New Jersey made the first coast-to-coast flight in a hot air balloon.
1980 Leo Loudenslager, of Sussex, New Jersey won the World Aerobatic championship. Throughout his career he won seven National Aerobatic championships.
1984 Astronaut Kathryn Dwyer Sullivan, of Paterson, New Jersey was the first woman to walk in space.
1991 During Desert Storm, Major Marie Rossi of Oradell, New Jersey was the first American woman to fly in combat.
1991 Rick Trader flew his home-built Ultralight aircraft 15,000 miles from coast to coast and north to Alaska before returning to New Jersey.
1994 Kenneth Johnson (pilot) and Larry Cioppi of Ringoes, New Jersey flew around the world in their Glasair  monoplane.

See also

 List of aviation awards
 List of aerospace museums
 North American aviation halls of fame

References

External links

Official website

Aerospace museums in New Jersey
New J
New Jersey Hall of Fame Aviation
Halls of fame in New Jersey
Biographical museums in New Jersey
Museums in Bergen County, New Jersey
Hasbrouck Heights, New Jersey
Moonachie, New Jersey
Teterboro, New Jersey
Organizations established in 1972